The qualifying rounds of the 2014 CAF Champions League were played from 7 February to 30 March 2014, to decide the eight teams which advanced to the group stage.

Draw
The draw for the preliminary, first and second qualifying rounds was held on 16 December 2013 in Marrakech, Morocco. The entry round of each team was determined by their ranking points calculated based on performances in continental club championships for the period 2009–2013.

The following 58 teams were entered into the draw:

Format
Qualification ties were played on a home-and-away two-legged basis. If the sides were level on aggregate after the second leg, the away goals rule was applied, and if still level, the tie proceeded directly to a penalty shoot-out (no extra time was played).

Schedule
The schedule of each round was as follows.

Preliminary round
The preliminary round included the 52 teams that did not receive byes to the first round.

|}

Young Africans won 12–2 on aggregate and advanced to the first round.

2–2 on aggregate. Berekum Chelsea won the penalty shoot-out and advanced to the first round.

Al-Ahly Benghazi won 4–2 on aggregate and advanced to the first round.

1–1 on aggregate. Gor Mahia won the penalty shoot-out and advanced to the first round.

Enyimba won 4–3 on aggregate and advanced to the first round.

3–3 on aggregate. AS Real Bamako won on the away goals rule and advanced to the first round.

Les Astres won 4–0 on aggregate and advanced to the first round.

2–2 on aggregate. Barrack Young Controllers  won on the away goals rule and advanced to the first round.

Séwé Sport advanced to the first round after Os Balantas withdrew.

Dedebit won 3–2 on aggregate and advanced to the first round.

Horoya won 4–1 on aggregate and advanced to the first round.

Raja Casablanca won 8–1 on aggregate and advanced to the first round.

Flambeau de l’Est won 2–1 on aggregate and advanced to the first round.

ES Sétif advanced to the first round after Steve Biko withdrew.

1–1 on aggregate. ASFA Yennenga won the penalty shoot-out and advanced to the first round.

Stade Malien won 7–3 on aggregate and advanced to the first round.

2–2 on aggregate. AC Léopards won on the away goals rule and advanced to the first round.

Primeiro de Agosto won 3–2 on aggregate and advanced to the first round.

Kaizer Chiefs won 4–1 on aggregate and advanced to the first round.

Liga Muçulmana won 1–0 on aggregate and advanced to the first round.

Dynamos won 4–1 on aggregate and advanced to the first round.

AS Vita Club won 4–3 on aggregate and advanced to the first round.

Zamalek won 3–0 on aggregate and advanced to the first round.

Kabuscorp won 7–2 on aggregate and advanced to the first round.

Nkana won 5–4 on aggregate and advanced to the first round.

Kampala City Council won 3–2 on aggregate and advanced to the first round.

First round
The first round included 32 teams: the 26 winners of the preliminary round, and the 6 teams that received byes to this round.

|}

1–1 on aggregate. Al-Ahly won the penalty shoot-out and advanced to the second round.

Al-Ahly Benghazi won 3–1 on aggregate and advanced to the second round.

Espérance de Tunis won 8–2 on aggregate and advanced to the second round.

2–2 on aggregate. AS Real Bamako won on the away goals rule and advanced to the second round.

TP Mazembe won 4–1 on aggregate and advanced to the second round.

Séwé Sport won 4–3 on aggregate and advanced to the second round.

CS Sfaxien won 4–1 on aggregate and advanced to the second round.

1–1 on aggregate. Horoya won the penalty shoot-out and advanced to the second round.

Coton Sport won 5–1 on aggregate and advanced to the second round.

ES Sétif won 5–0 on aggregate and advanced to the second round.

Al-Hilal won 2–0 on aggregate and advanced to the second round.

AC Léopards won 4–3 on aggregate and advanced to the second round.

Kaizer Chiefs won 7–0 on aggregate and advanced to the second round.

AS Vita Club won 1–0 on aggregate and advanced to the second round.

Zamalek won 1–0 on aggregate and advanced to the second round.

Nkana won 4–3 on aggregate and advanced to the second round.

Second round
The second round included the 16 winners of the first round.

The winners of each tie advanced to the group stage, while the losers entered the Confederation Cup play-off round.

|}

Al-Ahly Benghazi won 4–2 on aggregate and advanced to the group stage. Al-Ahly entered the Confederation Cup play-off round.

Espérance de Tunis won 4–1 on aggregate and advanced to the group stage. AS Real Bamako entered the Confederation Cup play-off round.

2–2 on aggregate. TP Mazembe won on the away goals rule and advanced to the group stage. Séwé Sport entered the Confederation Cup play-off round.

CS Sfaxien won 3–0 on aggregate and advanced to the group stage. Horoya entered the Confederation Cup play-off round.

ES Sétif won 2–0 on aggregate and advanced to the group stage. Coton Sport entered the Confederation Cup play-off round.

1–1 on aggregate. Al-Hilal won on the away goals rule and advanced to the group stage. AC Léopards entered the Confederation Cup play-off round.

AS Vita Club won 3–2 on aggregate and advanced to the group stage. Kaizer Chiefs entered the Confederation Cup play-off round.

Zamalek won 5–0 on aggregate and advanced to the group stage. Nkana entered the Confederation Cup play-off round.

References

External links
Orange CAF Champions League 2014, CAFonline.com

1